In enzymology, a sulfite dehydrogenase is an enzyme that catalyzes the chemical reaction

sulfite + 2 ferricytochrome c + H2O  sulfate + 2 ferrocytochrome c + 2 H+

The 3 substrates of this enzyme are sulfite, ferricytochrome c, and H2O, whereas its 3 products are sulfate, ferrocytochrome c, and H+.

This enzyme belongs to the family of oxidoreductases, specifically those acting on a sulfur group of donor with a cytochrome as acceptor.  The systematic name of this enzyme class is sulfite:ferricytochrome-c oxidoreductase. Other names in common use include sulfite cytochrome c reductase, sulfite-cytochrome c oxidoreductase, and sulfite oxidase.  This enzyme participates in sulfur metabolism.

References

 
 

EC 1.8.2
Enzymes of unknown structure